The third season of the American television series This Is Us continues to follow the lives and connections of the Pearson family across several time periods. The season is produced by Rhode Island Ave. Productions, Zaftig Films, and 20th Century Fox Television, with Dan Fogelman, Isaac Aptaker, and Elizabeth Berger serving as showrunners.

A third season was ordered, alongside a second season, in January 2017, with production for season three beginning in July 2018. The season stars an ensemble cast featuring Milo Ventimiglia, Mandy Moore, Sterling K. Brown, Chrissy Metz, Justin Hartley, Susan Kelechi Watson, Chris Sullivan, Jon Huertas, Melanie Liburd, Niles Fitch, Logan Shroyer, Hannah Zeile, Mackenzie Hancsicsak, Parker Bates, Eris Baker, Faithe Herman, Lonnie Chavis, and Lyric Ross.

The third season premiered on September 25, 2018 and concluded on April 2, 2019. The season consisted of 18 episodes.

Cast and characters

Main
 Milo Ventimiglia as Jack Pearson
 Mandy Moore as Rebecca Pearson
 Sterling K. Brown as Randall Pearson
 Niles Fitch as teenage Randall Pearson
 Lonnie Chavis as young Randall Pearson
 Chrissy Metz as Kate Pearson
 Hannah Zeile as teenage Kate Pearson
 Mackenzie Hancsicsak as young Kate Pearson
 Justin Hartley as Kevin Pearson
 Logan Shroyer as teenage Kevin Pearson
 Parker Bates as young Kevin Pearson
 Susan Kelechi Watson as Beth Pearson
 Chris Sullivan as Toby Damon
 Jon Huertas as Miguel Rivas
 Melanie Liburd as Zoe Baker
 Eris Baker as Tess Pearson
 Faithe Herman as Annie Pearson
 Lyric Ross as Deja Andrews

Recurring
 Caitlin Thompson as Madison
 Sumalee Montano as Dr. Gail Jasper
 Rob Morgan as Solomon Brown
 Michael Angarano as young adult Nicholas "Nick" Pearson
 Porter Duong as Hien
 Peter Onorati as Stanley Pearson

Guest
 Ron Cephas Jones as William H. "Shakespeare" Hill
 Jane Kaczmarek as Mrs. Philips
 Charlie Robinson as present-day Donald Robinson
 Wendie Malick as Mary Damon, Toby's mother.
 Dan Lauria as Mr. Damon, Toby's father.
 Tim Jo as Jae-Won Yoo
 Joy Brunson as Shauna, Deja's mother.
 Denis O'Hare as Jessie
 Griffin Dunne as Nicholas "Nick" Pearson
 Phylicia Rashad as Carol Clarke, Beth's mother.
 Carl Lumbly as Abe Clarke, Beth's father.
 Akira Akbar as young Beth Pearson
 Rachel Hilson as teenage Beth Pearson
 Dakota Baccelli as young Zoe Baker
 Brianna Reed as teenage Zoe Baker
 Goran Visnjic as Vincent Kelly, Beth's ballet teacher.
 Alexandra Breckenridge as Sophie

Episodes

Production

Development
On January 18, 2017, NBC renewed the series for a second and third season of 18 episodes each, for a total of 36 additional episodes.

Casting
Main cast members Milo Ventimiglia, Mandy Moore, Sterling K. Brown, Chrissy Metz, Justin Hartley, Susan Kelechi Watson, Chris Sullivan, Jon Huertas and Ron Cephas Jones return from the second season as Jack Pearson, Rebecca Pearson, Randall Pearson, Kate Pearson, Kevin Pearson, Beth Pearson, Toby Damon, Miguel Rivas, and William H. Hill, respectively. Lyric Ross, who recurred as Deja throughout the second season, was subsequently promoted to the principal cast in the third season. In August 2018, Michael Angarano was cast to recur as Nick Pearson, Jack Pearson's brother; the character was first mentioned in the second season, and previously was depicted only briefly as a child. Melanie Liburd was promoted to series regular after guest starring in the second season as Zoe, Beth Pearson's cousin and Kevin Pearson's new love interest.

Filming
Production on the season officially began on July 10, 2018, in Los Angeles.

Reception

Ratings

References

General references

External links
 
 

2018 American television seasons
2019 American television seasons
This Is Us